Robert Strange Country House, also known as Myrtle Hill, is a historic home located at Fayetteville, Cumberland County, North Carolina. It was built about 1825, and is a -story, gable roofed, Federal style frame dwelling. It has a -story rear ell and features a gable portico supported by two Tuscan order columns.  Also on the property are a contributing spring house and a summer kitchen.  It was the country home of U.S. Senator Robert Strange (1796-1854). The house stood at the center of Strange's large plantation.

It was listed on the National Register of Historic Places in 1983.

References

Houses on the National Register of Historic Places in North Carolina
Federal architecture in North Carolina
Houses completed in 1825
Houses in Fayetteville, North Carolina
National Register of Historic Places in Cumberland County, North Carolina